Paradmete arnaudi is a species of sea snail, a marine gastropod mollusk in the family Volutomitridae.

Description

Distribution

References

Volutomitridae
Gastropods described in 1996